Linga (hull number P-03) was a Storm class patrol boat of the Latvian Naval Forces. It was built in Bergen, Norway, in 1967–1968 and originally served in  the Royal Norwegian Navy under the name HNoMS Gnist.

After an agreement between the Latvian and Norwegian governments the ship became part of the Latvian Naval Forces and it arrived in Liepāja on June 9, 2001. It has a length of 36.5 metres, width of 6.2 metres, is equipped with twin MTU MD 16 V538 TB90 engines and has a total power of 7200 hp.

After almost eleven years of service in Latvian Naval Forces, she was decommissioned on May 25, 2012. All former COs were present at the ceremony.

References

Patrol vessels of the Latvian Naval Forces
Ships built in Bergen
1967 ships